Umbrella Waterfall is a waterfall located in the Sajikot area of Abbottabad District. It has recently emerged as a new tourist attraction in the KPK province of Pakistan. The waterfall is located 27 Kilometers from Havelian. To reach the waterfall, you have to hike down about 30 to 45 minutes from the village of Poona. The Umbrella Waterfall is on the same road where the famous Sajikot Waterfall is located. Umbrella Waterfall became a tourist attraction when a youtube channel, 'Shams Shaukat films' posted a vlog of umbrella waterfalls as world's most beautiful waterfall and it went viral on the internet. After that video went viral, many other YouTubers of Pakistan visited the place and covered the waterfall.

See also
List of waterfalls of Pakistan

References 

Tourism in Pakistan
Waterfalls of Pakistan